Nick Beardsley (born 23 September 1969) is a former Australian rules footballer who played for Fitzroy in the Australian Football League (AFL) in 1990. He was then drafted by Fitzroy with the 43rd selection in the 1990 Preseason Draft.

References

External links

Living people
1969 births
Fitzroy Football Club players
Australian rules footballers from Victoria (Australia)